Events in the year 1973 in Ireland.

Incumbents
 President:
 Éamon de Valera (until 24 June 1973)
 Erskine H. Childers (from 25 June 1973)
 Taoiseach:
 Jack Lynch (FF) (until 14 March 1973)
 Liam Cosgrave (FG) (from 14 March 1973)
 Tánaiste:
 Erskine H. Childers (FF) (until 14 March 1973)
 Brendan Corish (Lab) (from 14 March 1973)
 Minister for Finance:
 George Colley (FF) (until 14 March 1973)
 Richie Ryan (FG) (from 14 March 1973)
 Chief Justice:
 Cearbhall Ó Dálaigh (until 22 September 1973)
 William FitzGerald (from 25 September 1973)
 Dáil:
 19th (until 5 February 1973)
 20th (from 14 March 1973)
 Seanad:
 12th (until 30 March 1973)
 13th (from 1 June 1973)

Events
 1 January – Ireland joined the European Economic Community (EEC) along with Britain and Denmark.
 5 January – The Fifth Amendment of the Constitution of Ireland was signed into law, removing the "special position" of the Roman Catholic Church and recognition of certain other named religions.
 6 January – Patrick Hillery was appointed Social Affairs Commissioner of the EEC.
 28 February – The National Coalition of the Fine Gael party and Labour Party won the general election, ending 16 years of Fianna Fáil party government.
 8 March
  Northern Ireland sovereignty referendum (the "Border Poll"): 98.9 percent of voters wanted Northern Ireland to remain within the United Kingdom. Turnout was 58.7 percent overall, but fewer than one percent among Catholics.
  Provisional Irish Republican Army (IRA) bombs exploded in Whitehall and the Old Bailey in London.
 14 March – The new Taoiseach (prime minister), Liam Cosgrave, received his seal of office from President Éamon de Valera at the President's residence, Áras an Uachtaráin.
 25 March – The first edition of the Sunday World newspaper went on sale.
 2 April – The Civil Authorities (Special Powers) Act (Northern Ireland) 1922 was replaced by the Northern Ireland (Emergency Provisions) Act abolishing the death penalty for murder in Northern Ireland and establishing the Diplock courts.
 11 April – The funeral took place of the former Archbishop of Dublin, John Charles McQuaid.
 16 April – IRA chief Seán Mac Stíofáin was freed from jail.
 28 April – Six men, including Joe Cahill, were arrested by the Irish Naval Service off County Waterford on board a coaster carrying five tons of weapons destined for the IRA.
 5 May – Fianna Fáil politician Erskine Childers began a 28-day presidential campaign tour of the country.
 25 May – Islanders off the coast of County Donegal cast their votes in the presidential election ahead of the general population.
 30 May – Presidential election: voters cast their ballots to find a successor to Éamon de Valera. Erskine Childers was the victor, defeating Tom O'Higgins.
 6 June – Irish Continental Line (a joint venture between Irish Shipping Limited, Fearnley & Eger and Swedish company Lion Ferry) began operation with MS Saint Patrick on the Rosslare–Le Havre route.
 24 June – President Éamon de Valera retired from office aged 90. He travelled to Boland's Mill, where he was positioned during the Easter Rising. The motorcade then proceeded to Talbot Lodge nursing home in Blackrock where he spent his retirement. Erskine Childers was inaugurated as the fourth President of Ireland. After the ceremony at Dublin Castle he inspected a guard of honour and travelled through Dublin.
 28 June – The Northern Ireland Assembly election took place.
 10 July – The funeral of General Seán Mac Eoin took place in Ballinalee, County Longford.
 18 July – The office of Governor of Northern Ireland, at this time held by The Lord Grey of Naunton, was abolished under Section 32 of the Northern Ireland Constitution Act. The Secretary of State for Northern Ireland, a UK cabinet office created in 1972, took over the functions of the Governor on 20 December 1973 under letters patent.
 27 July – The government lifted colour restrictions on RTÉ television transmissions.
 31 July – The Civil Service (Employment of Married Women) Act 1973 removed the prohibition on married women working in the civil service.
 31 July – The first sitting of the Northern Ireland Assembly took place.
 1 September – The 27 Infantry Battalion of the Irish Army was formed, with headquarters at Aiken Barracks, Dundalk.
 10 October – The Dalai Lama Tenzin Gyatso, on his first visit to Ireland, went to Áras an Uachtaráin where he was welcomed by President Childers.
 31 October – Mountjoy Prison helicopter escape: three IRA prisoners escaped from Mountjoy Prison in Dublin in a hijacked helicopter that landed in the prison yard.
 1 November – James Flanagan became the first Roman Catholic Chief Constable of the Royal Ulster Constabulary.
 9 December – The Sunningdale Agreement was signed by British Prime Minister Edward Heath, Taoiseach Liam Cosgrave, Brian Faulkner, Gerry Fitt and Oliver Napier.

Arts and literature
 7 August – Hugh Leonard's play Da was staged for the first time in the United States (the Irish première was on 8 October at the Olympia Theatre in Dublin).
 February – Iris Murdoch's novel The Black Prince was published.
 September – Horslips album The Táin was recorded and released.

Sports

Single-handed sailing
 Anglo-Irish sailor Bill King completed a three-year solo world circumnavigation at the third attempt in his junk-rigged schooner Galway Blazer II.

Births
 12 March – Mark Daly, Fianna Fáil Senator.
 17 March – Caroline Corr, drummer with The Corrs.
 23 March – Brian Corcoran, Cork Gaelic footballer and hurler.
 26 March – James Keddy, association football player.
 29 April – Mike Hogan, bass guitarist with The Cranberries.
 5 May – Kevin McBride, boxer.
 7 May – Rick O'Shea, radio disc jockey.
 10 May – Dara Calleary, Fianna Fáil Teachta Dála (TD) for Mayo.
 14 May – Sinéad O'Carroll, singer and musician.
 25 May – Joe Dunne, association football player.
 28 May – Ryan Tubridy, television and radio presenter.
 12 June – Amanda Brunker, Miss Ireland and journalist.
 5 July – Róisín Murphy, singer, songwriter and producer.
 30 July – Dave Savage, association football player.
 2 August – Stephen McGuinness, association football player.
 21 August – Mickey Joe Harte, singer-songwriter.
 5 September – Robbie Brunton, association football player (died 2020).
 17 September – Mark Kenny, association football player.
 19 September – Nick Colgan, association football player.
 22 September – Trevor Brennan, international rugby player.
 30 October – Anthony Foley, international rugby player (died 2016).
 2 November – John Hayes, rugby player.
 5 November – Gráinne Seoige, journalist, television presenter.
 14 November – Andrew Strong, actor and singer.
 2 December – Graham Kavanagh, association football player.
 7 December – Damien Rice, singer songwriter.
 14 December – Pat Burke, basketball player.
 14 December – Amanda Byram, television presenter.
 24 December – Oisin Fagan, boxer.

Full date unknown
 Claire Kilroy, novelist.
 Oisín McGann, author and illustrator.
 Seánie McMahon, Clare hurler.
 Sarah O'Flaherty, television presenter.
 Caitriona O'Reilly, poet and critic.

Deaths
 5 January – Gerald Boland, founder member of the Fianna Fáil party, government minister (born 1885).
 10 January – Denis Rolleston Gwynn, journalist, author, and professor of Modern Irish History (born 1893).
 12 January – Maurice Collis, colonial administrator and writer (born 1889).
 19 January – Max Adrian, actor (born 1903).
 31 January – Jack MacGowran, actor (born 1918).
 January – Willie Clancy, uileann piper (born 1918).
 22 February – Elizabeth Bowen, novelist and short story writer (born 1899).
 13 March – Eddie Ingram, cricketer (born 1910).
 8 April – E. R. Dodds, classical scholar (born 1893).
 9 April – Warren Lewis, soldier and historian, brother of C. S. Lewis (born 1895).
 17 May – Lory Meagher, Kilkenny hurler (born 1899).
 18 May – Ronald Ossory Dunlop, painter and author (born 1894).
 21 May – Eugene O'Callaghan, Bishop of Clogher 1943–1969 (born 1888).
 24 May – Bryan Cusack, doctor, Sinn Féin party Member of Parliament (MP), member of the first Dáil (born 1882).
 7 April – John Charles McQuaid, Catholic Archbishop of Dublin and Primate of Ireland (born 1895).
 7 July – Seán MacEoin, major general, former Fine Gael TD and Cabinet minister (born 1893).
 25 July – Michael Davern, Fianna Fáil TD for Tipperary South 1948–1965 (born 1900).
 18 August – Basil Brooke, 1st Viscount Brookeborough, Ulster Unionist Party MP, third Prime Minister of Northern Ireland (born 1888).
 21 August – Dinny Barry-Murphy, Cork hurler (born 1903).
 20 September – Patrick O'Keeffe, member of First Dáil representing North Cork.
 26 October – Tomás Bairéad, journalist and author (born 1893).
 31 October – Elizabeth Watkins, born in Ireland, died as the oldest person in the world (born 1863).
 4 December – Tom McEllistrim, Fianna Fáil TD (born 1894).

See also
1973 in Irish television

References

 
1970s in Ireland
Ireland
Years of the 20th century in Ireland